Governor Foss may refer to:

Eugene Foss (1858–1939), 45th Governor of Massachusetts
Joe Foss (1915–2003), 20th Governor of South Dakota